Just One Time may refer to:

Film
Just One Time (film), 1999 comedy film directed by Lane Janger.
Just One Time (short film), a 1998 short also directed by Lane Janger and on which the 1999 long feature is based on 
Just This Once, 1952 film directed by Don Weis
Just One More Time, 1974 British comedy film directed by Maurice Hamblin

Music
Just One Time (album), an album by  American country music artist, Connie Smith
"Just One Time" (song), a single by American country music artist Don Gibson, also covered by Connie Smith in her album of same title